The Newhall School District is an elementary school district in the Santa Clarita Valley that serves the Valencia and Newhall communities within the city of Santa Clarita, California, as well as the Stevenson Ranch community in unincorporated Los Angeles County. It currently includes ten schools.

History

The first school in the district was Newhall Elementary. The school opened in 1876, near the current location of the Saugus Cafe. The school is named for Henry Mayo Newhall, as is the town. The school and the town of Newhall moved two years later, to a location 2 miles south of its original location. An oil boom in the Santa Clarita Valley brought the families of 53 students to area and the school was placed where the current Valencia Marketplace (Target store) currently stands. One year later, in 1879, a proper school house was built at the corner of 9th and Walnut streets, in the current town of Newhall. The building was a wooden, two-story building. The second story was used on weekends, for Sunday school classes. This original building succumbed to a fire in 1890.

A new two-story school was built on the same site as the first two-story building. Those students who continued on to high school faced a long horseback ride to San Fernando High School, in the San Fernando Valley, once that school was built in 1896.
In 1914, a fire struck Newhall Elementary School again. Another building was built at the northwest corner of Lyons and Newhall Avenues. The older students were able to catch a ride in a converted automobile to San Fernando High School. In 1932, an actual bus was purchased. 
As the town grew, so did its school-aged population. The schoolhouse at Lyons and Newhall Ave. was not able to be expanded and so a new school was built in 1928 at the corner of 11th and Walnut streets. Fire hit the school again in 1939; however, the school was rebuilt where it stood. The school re-opened in 1940. This is the current location of Newhall Elementary School (2012).

As for the older students, they would continue to travel until 1945 when Hart High School opened. The original grades were 9th–12th. In 1948, the 7th and 8th graders moved to Hart High School. Hart High stayed a 7th–12th grade school until Placerita Junior High School opened in 1961.

The second school in the Newhall School District was Peachland Elementary School which opened in 1959. The third was Wiley Canyon Elementary School which opened in 1966.

On January 13, 1945, the California State Board of Education approved the petitions of five Santa Clarita Valley school districts — Newhall, Saugus, Castaic, Mint Canyon and Sulphur Springs — to form the Santa Clarita Union High School District, later renamed the William S. Hart Union High School District. Two weeks later, on January 29, local voters approved a bond measure to build the valley's first high school on a 27-acre parcel on Newhall Avenue, just down the street from Newhall School (Hart High School).
The first Hart District school board was composed of school board members from each of the elementary districts. Tom Frew III and S.S. Donaldson represented the Newhall district. Donaldson was a sitting Newhall school board member, while Frew had already retired from a lengthy tenure on the Newhall board which included several years as president.

Schools

References

External links
 
 For an expanded version of this please visit - http://www.scvhistory.com/scvhistory/newhallschool.htm
 

School districts in Los Angeles County, California
Education in Santa Clarita, California
1876 establishments in California
School districts established in 1876